The 2009–10 New York Knicks season was the 64th season of the New York Knicks in the National Basketball Association (NBA).

Key dates
June 25 – The 2009 NBA draft took place in New York City.
July 8 – The free agency period started.

Summary

NBA Draft 2009

Free agency

Draft picks

Roster

Pre-season

Regular season

Standings

Record vs. opponents

Game log

|- bgcolor="#ffcccc"
| 1
| October 28
| @ Miami
| 
| Danilo Gallinari, David Lee (22)
| David Lee (9)
| Chris Duhon (5)
| AmericanAirlines Arena 19,600
| 0–1
|- bgcolor="#ffcccc"
| 2
| October 30
| @ Charlotte
| 
| Al Harrington, David Lee, Nate Robinson (17)
| David Lee (18)
| Chris Duhon (8)
| Time Warner Cable Arena 18,624
| 0–2
|- bgcolor="#ffcccc"
| 3
| October 31
| Philadelphia
| 
| Al Harrington (42)
| Wilson Chandler, Al Harrington (6)
| Chris Duhon, Larry Hughes (6)
| Madison Square Garden 19,763
| 0–3

|- bgcolor="#bbffbb"
| 4
| November 2
| New Orleans
| 
| David Lee (28)
| Al Harrington, David Lee (8)
| Chris Duhon (9)
| Madison Square Garden 19,763
| 1–3
|- bgcolor="#ffcccc"
| 5
| November 4
| Indiana
| 
| Al Harrington (22)
| David Lee (19)
| Chris Duhon (6)
| Madison Square Garden 19,273
| 1–4
|- bgcolor="#ffcccc"
| 6
| November 6
| Cleveland
| 
| David Lee (21)
| David Lee, Wilson Chandler (6)
| Chris Duhon (8)
| Madison Square Garden 15,874
| 1–5
|- bgcolor="#ffcccc"
| 7
| November 7
| @ Milwaukee
| 
| David Lee (18)
| David Lee (7)
| David Lee, Larry Hughes, Chris Duhon (4)
| Bradley Center 15,486
| 1–6
|- bgcolor="#ffcccc"
| 8
| November 9
| Utah
| 
| Toney Douglas (21)
| Wilson Chandler (10)
| Larry Hughes (5)
| Madison Square Garden 19,355
| 1–7
|- bgcolor="#ffcccc"
| 9
| November 11
| Atlanta
| 
| Toney Douglas, Al Harrington (23)
| Al Harrington (12)
| Larry Hughes (8)
| Madison Square Garden 19,699
| 1–8
|- bgcolor="#ffcccc"
| 10
| November 13
| Golden State
| 
| Danilo Gallinari (19)
| Danilo Gallinari (10)
| Chris Duhon (7)
| Madison Square Garden 19,763
| 1–9
|- bgcolor="#bbffbb"
| 11
| November 18
| @ Indiana
| 
| Al Harrington (26)
| Larry Hughes (10)
| Chris Duhon (8)
| Conseco Fieldhouse12,258
| 2–9
|- bgcolor="#bbffbb"
| 12
| November 21
| @ New Jersey
| 
| Al Harrington, Danilo Gallinari (17)
| David Lee (12)
| Chris Duhon (8)
| Izod Center 14,050
| 3–9
|- bgcolor="#ffcccc"
| 13
| November 22
| Boston
| 
| Al Harrington (30)
| David Lee (16)
| Chris Duhon (6)
| Madison Square Garden 19,763
| 3–10
|- bgcolor="#ffcccc"
| 14
| November 24
| @ LA Lakers
| 
| Nate Robinson, Wilson Chandler (15)
| Wilson Chandler, David Lee (7)
| Chris Duhon (6)
| Staples Center 18,997
| 3–11
|- bgcolor="#ffcccc"
| 15
| November 25
| @ Sacramento
| 
| David Lee, Nate Robinson (25)
| David Lee (12)
| Nate Robinson, Al Harrington (5)
| ARCO Arena 11,375
| 3–12
|- bgcolor="#ffcccc"
| 16
| November 27
| @ Denver
| 
| Al Harrington (41)
| Al Harrington, David Lee (10)
| Larry Hughes (9)
| Pepsi Center 19,155
| 3–13
|- bgcolor="#ffcccc"
| 17
| November 29
| Orlando
| 
| Nate Robinson (24)
| David Lee (12)
| Chris Duhon (9)
| Madison Square Garden 18,861
| 3–14

|- bgcolor="#bbffbb"
| 18
| December 1
| Phoenix
| 
| Danilo Gallinari (27)
| Danilo Gallinari (10)
| Larry Hughes (12)
| Madison Square Garden 19,763
| 4–14
|- bgcolor="#ffcccc"
| 19
| December 2
| @ Orlando
| 
| Wilson Chandler (24)
| Danilo Gallinari (7)
| Danilo Gallinari, Larry Hughes (3)
| Amway Arena 17,461
| 4–15
|- bgcolor="#bbffbb"
| 20
| December 4
| @ Atlanta
| 
| Al Harrington (27)
| David Lee (17)
| Chris Duhon (10)
| Philips Arena 17,165
| 5–15
|- bgcolor="#bbffbb"
| 21
| December 6
| New Jersey
| 
| Al Harrington (26)
| Al Harrington (14)
| Al Harrington, Chris Duhon (5)
| Madison Square Garden 19,602
| 6–15
|- bgcolor="#bbffbb"
| 22
| December 7
| Portland
| 
| Larry Hughes (21)
| David Lee (10)
| Chris Duhon (9)
| Madison Square Garden 19,763
| 7–15
|- bgcolor="#bbffbb"
| 23
| December 11
| @ New Orleans
| 
| Al Harrington (28)
| David Lee (14)
| Chris Duhon (9)
| New Orleans Arena15,569
| 8–15
|- bgcolor="#ffcccc"
| 24
| December 15
| @ Charlotte
| 
| Chris Duhon (18)
| David Lee (8)
| Chris Duhon (6)
| Time Warner Cable Arena 13,606
| 8–16
|- bgcolor="#ffcccc"
| 25
| December 17
| @ Chicago
| 
| Chris Duhon, Danilo Gallinari, Al Harrington (18)
| Jared Jeffries (9)
| Chris Duhon (7)
| United Center 19,791
| 8–17
|- bgcolor="#bbffbb"
| 26
| December 18
| Los Angeles Clippers
| 
| David Lee (25)
| David Lee (11)
| Chris Duhon (10)
| Madison Square Garden 19,763
| 9–17
|- bgcolor="#bbffbb"
| 27
| December 20
| Charlotte
| 
| Wilson Chandler (26)
| David Lee (15)
| David Lee (7)
| Madison Square Garden 18,767
| 10–17
|- bgcolor="#bbffbb"
| 28
| December 22
| Chicago
| 
| Al Harrington (20)
| David Lee (21)
| David Lee (5)
| Madison Square Garden 19,763
| 11–17
|- bgcolor="#ffcccc"
| 29
| December 25
| Miami
|  
| Danilo Gallinari (26)
| David Lee (16)
| Danilo Gallinari, Chris Duhon (3)
| Madison Square Garden 19,763
| 11–18
|- bgcolor="#ffcccc"
| 30
| December 27
| San Antonio
|  
| David Lee (28)
| David Lee (10)
| Chris Duhon (13)
| Madison Square Garden 19,763
| 11–19
|- bgcolor="#bbffbb"
| 31
| December 29
| @ Detroit
| 
| David Lee (30)
| David Lee (12)
| Chris Duhon (7)
| The Palace of Auburn Hills 22,076
| 12–19
|- bgcolor="#ffcccc"
| 32
| December 30
| @ New Jersey
| 
| Al Harrington (25)
| David Lee (15)
| David Lee (8)
| Izod Center 17,575
| 12–20

|- bgcolor="#bbffbb"
| 33
| January 1
| @Atlanta
| 
| Nate Robinson (41)
| Wilson Chandler (17)
| Nate Robinson (8)
| Philips Arena 17,366
| 13–20
|- bgcolor="#bbffbb"
| 34
| January 3
| Indiana
| 
| Wilson Chandler (23)
| David Lee (16)
| Chris Duhon (7)
| Madison Square Garden 19,763
| 14–20
|- bgcolor="#bbffbb"
| 35
| January 7
| Charlotte
| 
| Wilson Chandler (27)
| Jared Jeffries (10)
| Wilson Chandler, Chris Duhon (6)
| Madison Square Garden 19,763
| 15–20
|- bgcolor="#ffcccc"
| 36
| January 9
| @ Houston
| 
| David Lee (26)
| David Lee (12)
| David Lee (6)
| Toyota Center15,693
| 15–21
|- bgcolor="#ffcccc"
| 37
| January 11
| @ Oklahoma City
| 
| Nate Robinson (19)
| David Lee (13)
| David Lee (4)
| Ford Center 17,152
| 15–22
|- bgcolor="#bbffbb"
| 38
| January 13
| @ Philadelphia
| 
| David Lee (24)
| David Lee, Jared Jeffries (9)
| Chris Duhon (7)
| Wachovia Center 12,444
| 16–22
|- bgcolor="#ffcccc"
| 39
| January 15
| Toronto
| 
| Al Harrington (31)
| David Lee (14)
| David Lee (9)
| Madison Square Garden 19,763
| 16–23
|- bgcolor="#ffcccc"
| 40
| January 16
| @Detroit
| 
| Danilo Gallinari (27)
| David Lee (17)
| David Lee (9)
| The Palace of Auburn Hills 19,185
| 16–24
|- bgcolor="#bbffbb"
| 41
| January 18
| Detroit
| 
| Nate Robinson (27)
| David Lee (15)
| David Lee, Chris Duhon (5)
| Madison Square Garden 19,302
| 17–24
|- bgcolor="#ffcccc"
| 42
| January 22
| Los Angeles
| 
| David Lee (31)
| David Lee (17)
| Chris Duhon (8)
| Madison Square Garden 19,673
| 17–25
|- bgcolor="#ffcccc"
| 43
| January 24
| Dallas
| 
| Jared Jeffries (14)
| David Lee (14)
| Chris Duhon (4)
| Madison Square Garden 19,418
| 17–26
|- bgcolor="#bbffbb"
| 44
| January 26
| Minnesota
| 
| David Lee (28)
| David Lee (10)
| Chris Duhon (13)
| Madison Square Garden 18,111
| 18–26
|- bgcolor="#ffcccc"
| 45
| January 28
| Toronto
| 
| David Lee (29)
| David Lee (18)
| Chris Duhon (9)
| Madison Square Garden 18,828
| 18–27
|- bgcolor="#ffcccc"
| 46
| January 30
| @ Washington
| 
| David Lee (24)
| Danilo Gallinari (10)
| David Lee (6)
| Verizon Center 16,233
| 18–28
|- bgcolor="#ffcccc"
| 47
| January 31
| @ Minnesota
| 
| Wilson Chandler (27)
| David Lee (11)
| Jared Jeffries (5)
| Target Center 13,711
| 18–29

|- bgcolor="#bbffbb"
| 48
| February 3
| Washington
| 
| Nate Robinson (23)
| David Lee (10)
| Nate Robinson (8)
| Madison Square Garden 19,225
| 19–29
|- bgcolor="#ffcccc"
| 49
| February 5
| Milwaukee
| 
| David Lee (32)
| David Lee (15)
| Nate Robinson (7)
| Madison Square Garden 19,247
| 19–30
|- bgcolor="#ffcccc"
| 50
| February 6
| @Cleveland
| 
| Nate Robinson (26)
| David Lee (8)
| Chris Duhon (8)
| Quicken Loans Arena 20,562
| 19–31
|- bgcolor="#ffcccc"
| 51
| February 9
| Sacramento
| 
| Wilson Chandler (35)
| David Lee, Jared Jeffries (10)
| Chris Duhon (9)
| Madison Square Garden 19,531
| 19–32
|- bgcolor="#ffcccc"
| 52
| February 16
| @ Chicago
| 
| David Lee (24)
| David Lee (12)
| David Lee (4)
| United Center 20,989
| 19–33
|- bgcolor="#ffcccc"
| 53
| February 17
| Chicago
| 
| Al Harrington (27)
| David Lee (12)
| Chris Duhon (8)
| Madison Square Garden 19,763
| 19–34
|- bgcolor="#ffcccc"
| 54
| February 20
| Oklahoma City
| 
| David Lee (30)
| David Lee (10)
| David Lee, Sergio Rodríguez (6) 
| Madison Square Garden 19,763
| 19–35
|- bgcolor="#ffcccc"
| 55
| February 22
| Milwaukee
| 
| Tracy McGrady (15)
| David Lee (13)
| Eddie House (3)
| Madison Square Garden 19,763
| 19–36
|- bgcolor="#ffcccc"
| 56
| February 23
| @Boston
| 
| David Lee (28)
| David Lee (15)
| Tracy McGrady (8)
| TD Garden 18,624
| 19–37
|- bgcolor="#bbffbb"
| 57
| February 26
| @Washington
| 
| Al Harrington (37)
| David Lee (16)
| Sergio Rodríguez (7)
| Verizon Center 17,408
| 20–37
|- bgcolor="#ffcccc"
| 58
| February 27
| Memphis
| 
| Al Harrington (31)
| Wilson Chandler (8)
| Wilson Chandler (5)
| Madison Square Garden 19,763
| 20–38

|- bgcolor="#ffcccc"
| 59
| March 1
| @ Cleveland
| 
| Bill Walker (21)
| David Lee (10)
| Toney Douglas (6)
| Quicken Loans Arena 20,562
| 20–39
|- bgcolor="#bbffbb"
| 60
| March 3
| Detroit
| 
| Al Harrington (26)
| David Lee (18)
| David Lee (6)
| Madison Square Garden 19,341
| 21–39
|- bgcolor="#ffcccc"
| 61
| March 5
| @Toronto
| 
| David Lee (23)
| David Lee (18)
| Sergio Rodríguez (7)
| Air Canada Centre 18,889
| 21–40
|- bgcolor="#ffcccc"
| 62
| March 6
| New Jersey
| 
| David Lee (23)
| Wilson Chandler (10)
| Tracy McGrady (7)
| Madison Square Garden 19,763
| 21–41
|- bgcolor="#bbffbb"
| 63
| March 8
| Atlanta
| 
| Danilo Gallinari (27)
| David Lee (13)
| Sergio Rodríguez (4)
| Madison Square Garden 19,763
| 22–41
|- bgcolor="#ffcccc"
| 64
| March 10
| @ San Antonio
| 
| David Lee (21)
| David Lee (10)
| David Lee (4)
| AT&T Center18,278
| 22–42
|- bgcolor="#ffcccc"
| 65
| March 12
| @ Memphis
| 
| Bill Walker (21)
| David Lee (14)
| Wilson Chandler (4)
| FedExForum 12,236
| 22–43
|- bgcolor="#bbffbb"
| 66
| March 13
| @ Dallas
| 
| Bill Walker (23)
| David Lee (14)
| Toney Douglas (8)
| American Airlines Center20,224
| 23–43
|- bgcolor="#bbffbb"
| 67
| March 15
| @ Philadelphia
| 
| Danilo Gallinari (21)
| David Lee (16)
| Toney Douglas (7)
| Wachovia Center 13,563
| 24–43
|- bgcolor="#ffcccc"
| 68
| March 17
| @Boston
| 
| David Lee (29)
| David Lee (9)
| David Lee (7)
| TD Garden 18,624
| 24–44
|- bgcolor="#bbffbb"
| 69
| March 19
| Philadelphia
| 
| Danilo Gallinari (25)
| Al Harrington (13)
| Tracy McGrady (3)
| Madison Square Garden 19,763
| 25–44
|- bgcolor="#ffcccc"
| 70
| March 21
| Houston
| 
| David Lee (27)
| David Lee (20)
| David Lee (6)
| Madison Square Garden 17,242
| 25–45
|- bgcolor="#bbffbb"
| 71
| March 23
| Denver
| 
| Danilo Gallinari (28)
| David Lee (16)
| Toney Douglas (7)
| Madison Square Garden 19,763
| 26–45
|- bgcolor="#ffcccc"
| 72
| March 26
| @ Phoenix
| 
| Al Harrington (24)
| David Lee (13)
| Tracy McGrady (5)
| US Airways Center18,422
| 26–46
|- bgcolor="#ffcccc"
| 73
| March 29
| @Utah
| 
| Al Harrington (26)
| Al Harrington (17)
| Tracy McGrady (6)
| EnergySolutions Arena 19,911
| 26–47
|- bgcolor="#ffcccc"
| 74
| March 31
| @ Portland
| 
| David Lee (20)
| David Lee (10)
| David Lee (5)
| Rose Garden Arena 20,636
| 26–48

|- bgcolor="#ffcccc"
| 75
| April 2
| @ Golden State
| 
| David Lee (37)
| David Lee (20)
| David Lee (10)
| Oracle Arena 19,230
| 26–49
|- bgcolor="#bbffbb"
| 76
| April 4
| @ Los Angeles Clippers
| 
| David Lee (29)
| David Lee (10)
| Sergio Rodríguez (10)
| Staples Center 16,083
| 27–49
|- bgcolor="#bbffbb"
| 77
| April 6
| Boston
| 
| Danilo Gallinari (31)
| Earl Barron (18)
| Chris Duhon (8)
| Madison Square Garden 19,763
| 28–49
|- bgcolor="#ffcccc"
| 78
| April 7
| @Indiana
| 
| Toney Douglas (20)
| David Lee (16)
| Tracy McGrady (6)
| Conseco Fieldhouse15,330
| 28–50
|- bgcolor="#ffcccc"
| 79
| April 9
| @ Orlando
| 
| Danilo Gallinari (28)
| Earl Barron (12)
| Chris Duhon (5)
| Amway Arena 17,461
| 28–51
|- bgcolor="#ffcccc"
| 80
| April 11
| Miami
| 
| David Lee (26)
| Earl Barron (12)
| David Lee (5)
| Madison Square Garden 19,763 
| 28–52
|- bgcolor="#bbffbb"
| 81
| April 12
| Washington
| 
| David Lee (26)
| Earl Barron (13)
| Toney Douglas (5)
| Madison Square Garden 19,763
| 29–52
|- bgcolor="#ffcccc"
| 82
| April 14
| @Toronto
| 
| Bill Walker (28)
| David Lee (11)
| Toney Douglas, Chris Duhon, David Lee (5)
| Air Canada Centre 18,333
| 29–53

Player statistics

Regular season

|-
|- align="center"
| 
| 7 || 6 || 33.1 || .441 || N/A || .759 || 11.0 || 1.1 || .6 || .6 || 11.7
|-
|- align="center"
| 
| 25 || 1 || 11.7 || .400 || .359 || .923 || 2.1 || .6 || .1 || .7 || 4.7
|-
|- align="center"
| 
| 65 || 64 || 35.7 || .479 || .267 || .806 || 5.4 || 2.1 || .7 || .8 || 15.3
|-
|- align="center"
| 
| 7 || 0 || 8.9 || .381 || N/A || .588 || 1.9 || .0 || .0 || .1 || 3.7
|-
|- align="center"
| 
| 56 || 12 || 19.4 || .458 || .389 || .809 || 1.9 || 2.0 || .8 || .0 || 8.6
|-
|- align="center"
| 
| 67 || 59 || 30.9 || .373 || .349 || .716 || 2.7 || style="background:#ff8c00;"| 5.6 || .9 || .0 || 7.4
|-
|- align="center"
| 
| style="background:#ff8c00;"| 81 || 74 || 33.9 || .423 || .381 || .818 || 4.9 || 1.7 || .9 || .7 || 15.1
|-
|- align="center"
| *
| 11 || 0 || 12.7 || .487 || .000 || .636 || 2.8 || .6 || .5 || .1 || 4.1
|-
|- align="center"
| 
| 72 || 15 || 30.5 || .435 || .342 || .757 || 5.6 || 1.5 || .9 || .4 || 17.7
|-
|- align="center"
| *
| 18 || 0 || 20.6 || .331 || .250 || style="background:#ff8c00;"| 1.000 || 2.2 || 2.1 || .7 || .0 || 6.4
|-
|- align="center"
| 
| style="background:#ff8c00;"| 81 || style="background:#ff8c00;"| 81 || style="background:#ff8c00;"| 37.3 || style="background:#ff8c00;"| .545 || .000 || .812 || style="background:#ff8c00;"| 11.7 || 3.6 || 1.0 || .5 || style="background:#ff8c00;"| 20.2
|-
|- align="center"
| *
| 24 || 24 || 26.1 || .389 || .242 || .754 || 3.7 || 3.9 || .6 || .5 || 9.4
|-
|- align="center"
| *
| 27 || 8 || 19.7 || .491 || .347 || .806 || 1.4 || 3.4 || .8 || .1 || 7.4
|-
|- align="center"
| *
| 27 || 13 || 27.4 || .518 || style="background:#ff8c00;"| .431 || .787 || 3.1 || 1.4 || .8 || .1 || 11.9
|-
|- align="center"
| *
| 52 || 37 || 28.1 || .443 || .323 || .645 || 4.3 || 1.6 || 1.0 || style="background:#ff8c00;"| 1.1 || 5.5
|-
|- align="center"
| *
| 31 || 14 || 26.5 || .366 || .289 || .823 || 3.5 || 3.5 || style="background:#ff8c00;"| 1.3 || .4 || 9.6
|-
|- align="center"
| *
| 30 || 2 || 24.4 || .452 || .375 || .778 || 2.4 || 3.7 || .9 || .2 || 13.2
|-
|- align="center"
| *
| 24 || 0 || 10.5 || .446 || .000 || .714 || 2.5 || .3 || .4 || .4 || 4.0
|-
|- align="center"
| *
| 8 || 0 || 8.9 || .471 || N/A || N/A || 2.3 || .5 || .5 || .1 || 2.0
|-
|- align="center"
| *
| 17 || 0 || 6.4 || .390 || .346 || .600 || 1.1 || .0 || .1 || .1 || 2.6
|}
* – Stats with the Knicks.

Awards, records and milestones

Awards

Week/Month

All-Star
David Lee was named to the Eastern Conference All-Star Team
Nate Robinson won the NBA Slam Dunk Contest.
Danilo Gallinari participated in the Three-Point Contest.

Season

Records

Milestones

Injuries and surgeries

Transactions

Trades

Free agents

Additions

Subtractions

References

External links
2009–10 New York Knicks season at ESPN
2009–10 New York Knicks season at Basketball Reference

New York Knicks seasons
New York
New York Knicks
New York Knicks
2000s in Manhattan
2010s in Manhattan
Madison Square Garden